The 2015 Amateurs' Super Cup was the 2nd edition of the Greek Amateurs' Super Cup, an annual Greek football match played between the winner of the previous season's Gamma Ethniki Cup and the winner of the Amateur Cup. 

The match was contested by Trikala, winners of the 2014–15 Football League 2 Cup, and Nestos Chrysoupoli, the 2014–15 Greek Amateurs' Cup winners. Despite being considered the outsider, Nestos Chrysoupoli triumphantly won the match 3 − 0. This was in total the fourth trophy won by the club for the 2014–15 season, as Nestos had previously won the Kavala Football Clubs Association Championship and Cup double, along with the Greek Football Amateur Cup.

Details

References

2014–15 in Greek football